Dan Goggin (born 10 December 1994) is an Irish rugby union player for United Rugby Championship and European Rugby Champions Cup side Munster. He plays primarily as a centre, though he can also play as a winger, and represents Young Munster in the All-Ireland League.

Early life
Goggin was born Limerick and first played rugby at the age of 5 for UL Bohemians. He attended St Munchin's College and represented the school for three years in the Munster Schools Rugby Senior Cup before joining Young Munster.

Munster
Goggin made his competitive debut for Munster on 3 September 2016 when he started against Scarlets in the sides opening 2016–17 Pro12 fixture. Goggin came on as a replacement for Jaco Taute in Munster's famous 27–14 win against Māori All Blacks in Thomond Park on 11 November 2016. Goggin was nominated by his teammates for the 2017 John McCarthy Award for Academy Player of the Year, alongside Conor Oliver and Brian Scott. On 1 June 2017, it was announced that Goggin had been promoted to the senior Munster squad ahead of the 2017–18 season.

In Munster's opening 2017–18 Pro14 fixture against Benetton on 1 September 2017, in which Goggin was used as a replacement, he suffered a knee injury which subsequently ruled him out for 4 months. Goggin made his return from the injury on 19 January 2018, coming off the bench for Munster A in their 27–0 British and Irish Cup win against Ospreys Premiership Select. He signed a new two-year contract with Munster in February 2018.

Goggin scored his first try for Munster in their 39–22 away win against Southern Kings on 7 April 2018. He scored two tries in Munster's 64–7 win against Ulster in round 5 of the 2018–19 Pro14 on 29 September 2018. Goggin made his Champions Cup debut on 13 October 2018, starting in Munster's opening 2018–19 pool 2 fixture against English side Exeter Chiefs, which ended in a 10–10 draw in Sandy Park. He scored two tries in Munster's 31–24 away win against Connacht on 5 January 2019. For his performances throughout the 2018–19 season, Goggin was presented with the Munster Young Player of the Year award in late April 2019.

Goggin won his 50th cap for Munster during their 15–6 defeat against Saracens during round 4 of the 2019–20 Champions Cup on 14 December 2019. He made his first senior start on the wing for Munster in their 13–6 defeat against provincial rivals Leinster in round 9 of the 2019–20 Pro14 on 28 December 2019. Goggin signed a two-year contract extension with Munster in January 2020. A hand injury sustained in Munster's 2020–21 Pro14 win against Benetton on 30 January 2021 required surgery, ruling Goggin out for 7–8 weeks. He signed a two-year contract extension with Munster in January 2022.

International
Goggin played for the Ireland national rugby sevens team in 2015 and 2016. He was part of the Ireland squad that attempted to qualify for the 2016 Olympics, but lost to Spain in the quarter-finals and failed to qualify.

References

External links
Munster Profile
URC Profile

U20 Six Nations Profile

Living people
1994 births
People educated at St Munchin's College
Rugby union players from County Limerick
Young Munster players
Irish rugby union players
Munster Rugby players
Ireland international rugby sevens players
Rugby union centres
Rugby union wings